The 1970–71 Montreal Canadiens season was the club's 62nd season. After missing the playoffs in the previous season, the team rebounded to place third in the East Division, qualifying for the playoffs. Behind new star goalie Ken Dryden the team won their 17th Stanley Cup championship.

Regular season
On February 11, 1971, Jean Beliveau became the fourth player to score 500 career goals.

Final standings

Schedule and results

Playoffs

Quarter-final
 Versus Boston Bruins

Montreal wins the series 4–3.

Semi-final
 Versus Minnesota North Stars

Montreal wins the series 4–2.

Stanley Cup Final

Brothers Frank and Peter Mahovlich starred for the Canadiens, scoring nine goals in the seven game final series. Ken Dryden debuted for the Canadiens, while this was Jean Beliveau's final final series appearance, and he ended his career with ten championships.

 Versus Chicago Black Hawks

Montreal wins the series 4–3.

Player statistics

Regular season
Scoring

Goaltending

Playoffs
Scoring

Goaltending

Transactions

Awards and records
 Ken Dryden, Conn Smythe Trophy

Draft picks
Montreal's draft picks at the 1970 NHL Amateur Draft held at the Queen Elizabeth Hotel in Montreal, Quebec.

References
 Canadiens on Hockey Database
 Canadiens on NHL Reference

Stanley Cup championship seasons
Montreal Canadiens seasons
Mon
Mon